Dactylosporangium cerinum is a bacterium from the genus Dactylosporangium which has been isolated from rhizosphere soil of the tree Pinus koraiensis in Luobei, China.

References

 

Micromonosporaceae
Bacteria described in 2015